Fernand Lopez Owonyebe (born November 12, 1978) is a Cameroonian-French former mixed martial artist (MMA) and current MMA coach. He is best known for establishing MMA Factory, the biggest MMA gym in France, as well as being the former trainer of former UFC Heavyweight Champion Francis Ngannou and current trainer of former UFC Interim Heavyweight Champion Ciryl Gane.

Early life 

Lopez was born in 1978 in a small village in Lekié and grew up in Yaoundé. His father was a college professor and his mother was a high school teacher.

In his youth his father signed him up for lessons in combat sports such as Taekwondo, Boxing, Judo and Wrestling to defend himself from bullies.

In 1997, Lopez immigrated to France where he worked as an Electrical Engineer. On the side he would attend sports science classes at INSEP while playing Rugby in the Pro D2 league. However a neck injury sidelined him in Rugby and he had to have surgery to treat it, rendering him unable to move his neck for three years. During this period, Lopez discover to Brazilian Jiu-Jitsu (BJJ) leading him to gain an interest in mixed martial arts.

Mixed martial arts career 
Lopez joined Mathieu Nicourt’s Free Fight Academy where he initially trained in BJJ. Once his neck recovered, he resumed training in other combat sports like Wrestling and Boxing.

On 11 March 2006, Lopez made his professional MMA debut after a year of training. The bout took place at Xtreme Gladiators 2 where he submitted Cedric Deschamps via choke in the first round.

Lopez's professional MMA career lasted for four years from 2006 to 2010. He fought in various promotions such as M1 Global and Shooto, where his final record was ten wins and seven losses.

Coaching career

After retiring as a professional fighter, Lopez became an MMA coach at Free Fight Academy for a few years before deciding to establish his own gym.

In 2013 Lopez and his business partner, a police officer, opened a gym called 'Cross Fight' which was later renamed 'MMA Factory'.

Initially this academy had two students, but grew very fast to become the biggest gym in France with over 600 students. MMA Factory was one of only three gyms to receive sponsorship from Reebok, with the other two being AKA and SBG.

His most notable student was Francis Ngannou, who became the UFC Heavyweight champion in 2021 after defeating Stipe Miocic in a rematch at UFC 260. When Ngannou was 26, he moved from Cameroon to France in order pursue his dream of becoming a professional boxer.  Didier Carmont met Ngannou and  then introduced him to Lopez and the MMA factory. Lopez saw the potential of Ngannou and convinced him to try MMA even though Ngannou originally wanted to do boxing. Lopez gave Ngannou some MMA gear and allowed him to train and sleep at the gym at no cost.  Lopez and Ngannou worked very well together, with Ngannou having a successful winning streak in the UFC and eventually getting his first title shot. However Lopez was criticized after Ngannou lost to Stipe Miocic in a title bout at UFC 220. Since then the relationship between Lopez and Ngannou has deteriorated, with Lopez stating that Ngannou has ego problems and had refused to pay gym membership fees after he had achieved success. Ngannou moved to the United states to train at Xtreme Couture.

Lopez has trained Ciryl Gane who won the Interim UFC Heavyweight Championship after defeating Derrick Lewis on August 7, 2021 at UFC 265.

Lopez has also trained many other fighters such as Nassourdine Imavov, Ion Cuțelaba and Taylor Lapilus

Notable fighters trained
 Francis Ngannou - former UFC Heavyweight Champion
 Ciryl Gane - former UFC Interim Heavyweight Champion
 Ion Cuțelaba
 Taylor Lapilus
 Christian M'Pumbu
 Nassourdine Imavov
 Mickael Lebout
 Karl Amoussou

Mixed martial arts record

|-
|Win
|align=center|10–7
|Matteo Piran
|TKO (punches)
| ADFC - Round 2
|
|align=center|1
|align=center|4:20
|Abu Dhabi, United Arab Emirates
|
|-
|Loss
|align=center|9–7
|Patrick Vallee
|KO (front kick)
|100% Fight - VIP
|
|align=center|2
|align=center|2:53
|Aubervilliers, France
|
|-
| Win
|align=center|9–6
| Eric Cebarec
| Decision (unanimous)
| 100% Fight - VIP
|
|align=center|2
|align=center|5:00
|Aubervilliers, France
|
|-
| Win
|align=center|8–6
|Christophe Daffreville
|Decision (unanimous)
|PFC 2 - Pancrase Fighting Championship 2
|
|align=center|3
|align=center|5:00
|Marseille, Bouches-du-Rhône, France
|
|-
|Loss
|align=center|7–6
|Patrick Vallee
|KO (head kick)
|100% Fight - 100 Percent Fight 2
|
|align=center|1
|align=center|0:40
|Paris, France
|
|-
|Loss
|align=center|7–5
|Danijel Dzebic
|Submission (heel hook)
|M-1 Selection 2010: Western Europe Round 1
|
|align=center|1
|align=center|0:59
|Hilversum, North Holland, Netherlands
|
|-
| Win
|align=center|7–4
|Nicolas M'Bog
|Decision (unanimous)
|PFC - Challengers 1
|
|align=center|2
|align=center|5:00
|Marseille, Bouches-du-Rhône, France
|
|-
| Win
|align=center|6–4
|Karim Mammar
|TKO (punches)
|Shooto - Belgium
|
|align=center|1
|align=center|0:12
|Charleroi, Wallonia, Belgium
|
|-
| Win
|align=center|5–4
|Cedric Severac
|Submission (rear-naked choke)
|PMKE - Pro MMA Kempo Elite
|
|align=center|2
|align=center|2:58
|Lyon, France
|
|-
|Loss
|align=center|4–4
|Igor Araujo
|KO (knee)
|Yamabushi - Combat Sport Night 5
|
|align=center|2
|align=center|1:29
|Geneva, Switzerland
|
|-
| Win
|align=center|4–3
|Wojciech Jamrozik
|TKO
|PK - Pro Kumite
|
|align=center|1
|align=center|1:03
|Swindon, Wiltshire, England
|
|-
|Loss
|align=center|3–3
|Vasily Krilov
|TKO (punches)
|M-1 MFC: Fedor Emelianenko Cup
|
|align=center|1
|align=center|N/A
|Russia
|
|-
|Loss
|align=center|3–2
|Kamil Uygun
|TKO (punches)
|M-1: Slamm
|
|align=center|1
|align=center|N/A
|Almere, Flevoland, Netherlands.
|
|-
|Win
|align=center|3–1
|Delivrance Nsomboli
|Submission
|MYT - Mix-fight Yveslines Tournament
|
|align=center|N/A
|align=center|N/A
|France
|
|-
|Loss
|align=center|2–1
|Aziz Karaoglu
|TKO
|OC - Masters Fight Night 6
|
|align=center|2
|align=center|N/A
|Wuppertal, Germany
|
|-
|Win
|align=center|2–0
|Ali Yilmaz
|TKO
|OC 5 - Outsider Cup 5
|
|align=center|1
|align=center|2:31
|Duisburg, Germany
|
|-
| Win
|align=center|1–0
|Cedric Deshamps
|Submission (choke)
|XG 2 - Xtreme Gladiators 2
|
|align=center|1
|align=center|N/A
|Paris, France
|

References 

Living people
French male mixed martial artists
Cameroonian emigrants to France
Cameroonian practitioners of Brazilian jiu-jitsu
French practitioners of Brazilian jiu-jitsu
Cameroonian male taekwondo practitioners
French male taekwondo practitioners
Cameroonian male judoka
French male judoka
1978 births
Cameroonian male mixed martial artists
Middleweight mixed martial artists
Mixed martial artists utilizing boxing
Mixed martial artists utilizing taekwondo
Mixed martial artists utilizing wrestling
Mixed martial artists utilizing judo
Mixed martial arts trainers
Mixed martial artists utilizing Brazilian jiu-jitsu